Leonard "Jock" Livingston (3 May 1920 – 16 January 1998) was an Australian cricketer who played most of his first-class cricket in England.

Cricket career

Livingston was a hard-hitting left-handed batsman and an occasional wicketkeeper. He played five times for New South Wales with some success, but was not picked for the all-conquering 1948 Australian tour to England, and turned instead to Central Lancashire Cricket League cricket, where he played for Royton Cricket Club, marrying a local girl while there.

In 1949–50, when Marylebone Cricket Club (MCC) declined to tour India, the former England wicketkeeper George Duckworth assembled a Commonwealth side consisting of Lancashire League players plus a handful of English and West Indian cricketers. Livingston captained the side, which included Bill Alley, George Tribe and Frank Worrell. The tour was a big success and the side played five unofficial "Tests" against full Indian Test sides.

At the end of the tour, Livingston was signed as a batsman by Northamptonshire as part of the county's policy to import talented cricketers, a policy that brought in the England captain Freddie Brown from Surrey. Livingston was an immediate success, scoring 1966 runs in his first season, and over the next eight years he was often near the top of the English batting averages. In the three seasons from 1954, he scored more than 2000 runs per season, with a best performance of 2269 runs in 1954 at an average of more than 55 runs per innings. He had a less successful season in 1957 when the county side finished second in the County Championship, its highest ever placing, and he retired at the end of that season, reappearing in just a couple of later less serious matches, the last in 1964.

Livingston's value was not just in the runs that he scored, but also the style in which he scored them: in a period when defensive batting was commonplace, he hit the ball hard and often, and was no respecter of reputations. His presence at Northamptonshire also attracted other talented players, including fellow Australians Tribe and Jack Manning and the wicketkeeper Keith Andrew.

Rugby league
Livingston was also a talented rugby league player and spent three seasons playing with South Sydney in the NSWRL from 1941 to 1943.

Personal and later life
In retirement, he worked for the bat-making company Gray-Nicolls. He was Jewish.

See also
List of select Jewish cricketers

References

External links
 Wisden 1951 to 1958 editions
 CricketArchive: Jock Livingston
Rugby League project: Les 'Jock' Livingston

1920 births
1998 deaths
Australian cricketers
Australian rugby league players
Commonwealth XI cricketers
Cricketers from Sydney
Jewish Australian sportspeople
Jewish cricketers
Jewish rugby league players
Marylebone Cricket Club cricketers
New South Wales cricketers
North v South cricketers
Northamptonshire cricketers
Rugby league players from Sydney
South Sydney Rabbitohs players